Jennifer Bricker (born October 1, 1987) is an American acrobat and aerialist. She is the sister of gymnast Dominique Moceanu. Born without legs, she was placed for adoption by her parents.  She was a featured performer on Britney Spears' Circus Tour (2009) and was the first disabled high school tumbling champion in the state of Illinois.

In 1998, Bricker competed in the AAU Junior Olympics (power tumbling), placing fourth. The same year she received the U.S. Tumbling Association’s Inspiration Award.

Her history is detailed in her memoir Everything Is Possible: Finding the Faith and Courage to Follow Your Dreams, which was a New York Times bestseller. It was retold by the BBC in January 2017. Writing in Psychology Today, Nancy L. Segal  noted, "The sisters' reunion makes for an inspiring story of family ties broken and restored. But it also provides priceless material for research into the roles of nature and nurture in athletic prowess".

References

External links

Everything is Possible: Finding the Faith and Courage to Follow Your Dreams Jen Bricker autobiography with Sheryl Berk, 2016, Baker Books, Grand Rapids, MI, 
Everything is Possible Jen Bricker, TED talk, 2019.

1987 births
Living people
American adoptees
American amputees
American gymnasts
American people of Romanian descent
21st-century American women